Sultana is a 1934 Hindi/Urdu film directed by A. R. Kardar. The film was produced under the East India Film Company banner. The music director was Mushtaq Ahmed, who also played a small role in the film. The lyrics were written by Munshi Aziz. The cast included Gul Hamid, Zarina, Mazhar Khan, Nazir, Indubala, Nawab and Athar.

Cast
 Gul Hamid
 Zarina
 Mazhar Khan
 Nazir
 Indubala
 Vasantrao Pahelwan
 Nawab
 Lala Yaqoob
 Fida Hussain
 Athar
 Ali

Soundtrack
Akhbar Khan Peshawri sang two of the popular songs from the film, "Kitab-E-Dard Mein Likha Mere Gam Ka Fasana Hai" and "Mushkil Kusha Hai Naam Tera". The music composer was Mushtaq Ahmed.

Songlist

References

External links
 

1934 films
1930s Hindi-language films
Indian black-and-white films
Films directed by A. R. Kardar